Micho Russell (25 March 1915 – 19 February 1994) was an Irish musician and author best known for his expert tin whistle performance. He also played the simple-system flute and was a collector of traditional music and folklore.

Biography
Russell was born in Doonagore, Doolin, County Clare, Ireland. Russell came from a musically renowned family, his mother played the concertina, and his father was a sean-nós singer. He had two brothers, Packie and Gussie, who were also musicians. He also had two sisters. He never married.

Music
Russell taught himself to play the tin whistle by ear starting at age eleven. The 1960s revival of Irish traditional music brought him attention and performance opportunities. In 1973, Russell won the All-Ireland tin whistle competition, which further increased demand for his performances. Like Séamus Ennis, Russell was also known for his spoken introductions to tunes in his live performances, which incorporated folklore and legend. His knowledge of tradition extended past music to language, stories, dance, herbal lore, and old country cures.

Death
Russell died in a car accident on 19 February 1994 on his way home from a gig just prior to going back into the studio to record another CD.

Works

Original music
"Micho Russell's Reel," his only known composition, is a variant of an older tune he called "Carthy's Reel." He told Charlie Piggott, "...So Carthy was beyond anyway and he heard the old tune from a piper playing it and he had the first part but only three-quarters of the second part. So when Séamus Ennis came around collecting music, I put in the last bit. That's roughly the story of the tune." The reel has been recorded by other artists such as Mary Bergin. His best-known songs were John Phillip Holland and The Well of Spring Water.

Discography

Books

See also
 List of Irish music collectors

References

External links
 Biography at Micho Russell Festival Weekend Includes biographical abstract and select bibliography / discography.
 Ireland's Whistling Ambassador Publisher's site.
 Ireland's Whistling Ambassador review in Musical Traditions Internet Magazine
 Technique and Style in Irish Music Includes MP3 sound clips and extensive commentary on Russell's style
 Comhaltas Ceoltóirí Éireann biography
 Old Photos of Micho Russell and Doolin
 Micho Russell biography and four of Russell's albums available from this site

Irish flautists
Irish tin whistle players
Musicians from County Clare
1915 births
1994 deaths
20th-century flautists